Painter is a 2020 indie psychological thriller film about a rich art collector (Betsy Randle) and benefactor who becomes obsessed with an unknown artist.

Plot 
A close relationship forms super fast between a young painter Aldis (Eric Ladin) and his new friend Joanne, a wealthy art collector. Joanne takes Aldis into her home and the young artist unfortunately finds out that their relationship is based on obsession with a taste of delusion and jealousy.

The story has some similarities when it comes down to the subject mater relating to the contemporary art world, but the director takes on a different perspective compared to its psychological counterparts Velvet Buzzsaw and Nocturnal Animals.

Cast

Production 

 Written and directed by Cory Wexler Grant.
 Produced by Alexander Wenger and co-produced by Daisy Lora and Loring Weisenberger
 Executive producer was Jordan Wexler a.k.a. Jordan Wexler Grant
 Music by Dylan Glatthorn
 Cinematography by Pierluigi Malavasi

Release 
The film was released on October 13, 2020, on VOD / Digital release.

Distribution 
Distributed by 1844 Entertainment.

References 

2020 films
2020 independent films
2020 psychological thriller films
Films about fictional painters
Films shot in California
2020 directorial debut films